The 1987 Bordeaux Open also known as the Nabisco Grand Prix Passing Shot was a men's tennis tournament played on clay courts at Villa Primrose in Bordeaux, France that was part of the 1987 Nabisco Grand Prix circuit. It was the 10th edition of the tournament and was held from 13 July through 18 July 1987. Second-seeded Emilio Sánchez won the singles title.

Finals

Singles
 Emilio Sánchez defeated  Ronald Agénor 5–7, 6–4, 6–4
 It was Sánchez' 2nd singles title of the year and the 5th of his career.

Doubles
 Sergio Casal /  Emilio Sánchez defeated  Darren Cahill /  Mark Woodforde 6–3, 6–3

References

External links
 ITF tournament edition details

Bordeaux Open
ATP Bordeaux
Bordeaux Open
Bordeaux Open